Kalutara Vidyalaya is a Buddhist boys' school in Kalutara, Sri Lanka. The college was founded in 1941 by Sir Cyril De Zoysa. It is a national school providing primary and secondary education.

History 

Kalutara Vidyalaya was founded in Kalutara on 13 January 1941 by Sir Cyril De Zoysa. The college was formed as the twin brother of Kalutara Balika Vidyalaya, the girls' school. On 13 January 1941 the college officially started with 11 teachers and 56 students.

After only six months, the college became a senior secondary school. At the beginning, Kalutara Vidyalaya at the Martin Bungalow was a mixed school. On 7 January 1942, Kalutara Balika was established in Clammily House by P. de S. Kularatne, so Kalutara Vidyalaya became a boys' school. The first chapter of Kalutara Vidyalaya ended on 18 March 1942, when the Royal Air Force took the school for their use during World War II.

After a short break, Kalutara Vidyalaya was restarted at Kalutara Balika Vidyalaya. Sir Cyril De Zoysa noticed that it is hard to develop two schools and handed over his Brookline House to the Kalutara Balika Vidyalaya. In April 1946, the college began free education and was handed over to the government. In 1998 the college became a National School.

Today the school has about 3,500 students and more than 120 teachers.

First staff

 D. D. P. Samaraweera – Principal
 Al-Haj Badurdeen – Vice Principal (former Ministry of Education)
 A. Athukorala – first Art teacher
 Prasanna 'Perry' Perera – first student of the Kalutara Vidyalaya

Houses

The boys are divided into four houses, led by house captains. The houses compete in inter-house games and house colours are awarded to winners. The houses are:

Sena (brown)
Tissa (red)
Tilaka (orange)
Anura (white)

Principals

01. D. P. Samaraweera
02. H. M. Darmapriya
03. C. D. S. Siriwardane
04. Layanal Lokuliyane
05. M. B. Rathnayake
06. D. A. Weerasinghe
07. Dencil A. Silva
08. Upali Philip Senarathne
09. Gamini Goonerathne
10. A. G. de Silva
11. A. G. Weththasinghe
12. Thanthirige D. Ariyasena
13. H. Sarathchndra Silva
14. P. W. Nelson Perera
15. Mithrasena Ratiyala
16. K. A. D. Punyadasa
17. I. D. Piyarathne
18. Mahanama Siriwardena
19. H. M. Gunarathne
20. K. Rathnaweera Perera
21. H. Sarathchndra Silva
22. K. I. J. Peiris
23. M.Harshana Peiris

Battle of the Mangosteen

The annual cricket encounter between Kalutara Vidyalaya and Tissa Central College, known as the "Battle of the Mangosteen", has been held since 1949. It is the second-oldest Battle between the two leading Buddhist schools in Sri Lanka and the 11th-oldest school cricket encounter in Sri Lanka.

Notable alumni
 W. D. Amaradeva – Sri Lankan vocalist, musician, violinist and musical composer.
 Tillakaratne Dilshan – Sri Lankan cricketer (former captain of the Sri Lanka national cricket team)
 Somawansha Amarasinghe – former leader of Janatha Vimukthi Peramuna
 Narada Disasekara –  Sri Lankan classical singer
 Raj Somadeva – professor of archaeology
 Stanley Tillekeratne – Sri Lankan politician
 Shelley Wickramasinghe – former Sri Lankan cricketer, Chairman of the National Sports Council, vice-president of Sri Lanka Cricket
 Daya Alwis – actor in Sri Lankan cinema
 Wilson Gunaratne – actor in Sri Lankan cinema
 Athma Liyanage – Sri Lankan singer and songwriter
 Dulip Liyanage – former Sri Lankan cricketer 
 Lalith Kaluperuma – former Sri Lankan cricketer 
 Sujeewa de Silva – former Sri Lanka cricketer
 Malinga Bandara – former Sri Lankan cricketer
 Milinda Siriwardana – Sri Lankan cricketer
 Ravindra Kottahachchi – Sri Lankan cricket umpire
 Rohitha Kottahachchi – Sri Lankan cricket umpire
 Himasha Eashan – athlete
 Channa Jayasumana – professor, Faculty of Medicine, Rajarata University
 Rangika Halwatura – youngest professor of Civil Engineering in Sri Lanka
 Manilal Fernando – former international football official
 Hettikamkanamge Perera – Sri Lankan professional football referee
 Pathum Nissanka – Sri Lankan cricketer

References

External links 
Old Boys Association Website

Educational institutions established in 1941
National schools in Sri Lanka
Buddhist schools in Sri Lanka
Boys' schools in Sri Lanka
Schools in Kalutara
1941 establishments in Ceylon